The Lincoln Corsair is a compact luxury crossover marketed and sold by the Lincoln brand of Ford Motor Company since the 2020 model year. It replaces the outgoing MKC.

In 2020, the Corsair was the best-selling vehicle for the Lincoln brand.

Overview
The Lincoln Corsair made its debut on April 17, 2019 at the New York Auto Show and shares its underpinnings with the 2020 Ford Escape. The Corsair joins the Lincoln Nautilus (previously the Lincoln MKX), Lincoln Aviator, Lincoln Continental, and Lincoln Navigator in the Lincoln model line. The name "Corsair" has previously been used on several other Ford Motor Company products including the Edsel Corsair and the British Ford Corsair.

The Corsair is available in Base, Reserve, and Grand Touring trims, the latter of which is available as a gasoline/electric hybrid only.

The Corsair went on sale in the fall of 2019 and is offered in gasoline and plug-in hybrid versions. Chinese deliveries began in May 2020.

The transmission is no longer activated with a center console installed transmission selector; the computer controlled transmission uses buttons installed below the MyLincoln Touch infotainment touch screen labeled "P, R, N, D, S", In the late 1950s a similar feature was offered on all 1957 and 1958 Mercury sedans called Multi-Drive. During the same time, Chrysler offered the push button TorqueFlite and Packard offered the Ultramatic. The "S" transmission selection represents "Sport" mode, where the Continuously Controlled Damping suspension, electric power steering and transmission shift points take on a different posture.

In 2023, the Corsair received a facelift.

Sales

References

External links

Luxury crossover sport utility vehicles
Corsair
Luxury sport utility vehicles
Compact sport utility vehicles
Cars introduced in 2019
2020s cars